Jeremiah Abraham is a Filipino American film producer and marketing executive.

As Founder and CEO of Tremendous Communications, he quickly established himself and the company as one of the most sought after agencies to help major entertainment studios be more inclusive of the AAPI community in their campaigns and help spotlight AAPI talent from production to release. His overall mission is to impact the visibility of AAPIs in Hollywood which includes his work through Tremendous, producing AAPI films & television shows, and giving back to the AAPI community through non-profit organizations.

Jeremiah has worked on many notable PR & marketing campaigns for films and franchises including the Harry Potter, Star Wars, Marvel, DC Entertainment, and Warner Bros’ Crazy Rich Asians. Through Tremendous, he worked on A24’s Everything Everywhere All At Once, Lionsgate’s The Protege, Hulu’s Hit Monkey, Universal Pictures’ Fast and Furious 9, and Joy Koy’s upcoming film Easter Sunday with Universal Pictures to name a few.

He is also co-producer of breakthrough films in the AAPI community such as Sony Pictures’ Yellow Rose  and Lingua Franca which was distributed by Ava DuVernay’s Array Now. He is a producer on the upcoming ABS-CBN series Concepción. He currently serves on the Board of Advisors for FilAm Arts and the Board of Directors for The Peace Studio.

Early life 
Born in Manila, Abraham moved to Los Angeles at the age of five. He later attended UC Irvine, where he received his Bachelor’s of Science in Computer Engineering, and the University of Southern California, where he received his Masters of Communication Management with a concentration in Digital and Online Communities. His thesis project evolved into BakitWhy.com, which was one of the first digital media platforms for Filipino Americans.

Career 
In 2011, Abraham worked across various divisions within Warner Bros. Entertainment, including Warner Bros. Home Entertainment, Warner Bros. Interactive Entertainment, and Warner Bros. Pictures. While working with Warner Bros. Pictures, he aided in launching one of the first multicultural initiatives focused on the outreach towards Hispanic and Latinx movie-goers. During his time with Warner Bros. Interactive Entertainment, he oversaw global digital marketing for LEGO Video Games, Batman Arkham, Scribblenauts, and much more.

In 2016, Abraham left Warner Bros. to work with Condé Nast Entertainment, where he helped shape the marketing strategy for their digital video business, working with brands such as Vogue, GQ, Vanity Fair, and The New Yorker.

He then served as Director of Communications with a multicultural agency, where he focused on growing Asian American and multicultural segments into the mainstream market. Here Jeremiah worked on blockbuster and franchise films such as Crazy Rich Asians, Searching, Fantastic Beasts, Aquaman, and more.

In March 2020, he launched Tremendous Communications, a PR & marketing agency that works with a majority of the major entertainment studios in Hollywood including Universal Pictures, Lionsgate, A24, Hulu, Sony Pictures, Paramount, Focus Features, and ABS-CBN. Notable campaigns include: Universal’s Fast And Furious 9, Lionsgate’s The Protege, Focus Features’ Blue Bayou, Paramount’s Clifford The Big Red Dog, A24’s Everything Everywhere All At Once, Universal Pictures’ The 355, and Jo Koy’s upcoming film Easter Sunday with Universal Pictures.

Aside from television and film, Tremendous Communications has helped advocate for the Asian American community during increased violence and xenophobia amplified by the COVID-19 pandemic. They helped launch the Unapologetically Asian campaign, supported Racism Is A Virus, and contributed to the visibility of various initiatives and community advocates.

Jeremiah is also co-producer for Sony’s Yellow Rose and Lingua Franca which was distributed by Ava DuVernay’s Array Now. He is a producer on the upcoming series Concepción with ABS-CBN. In addition, is in development for various projects which aim to uplift Filipino American characters and stories.

Awards 
Jeremiah’s work won numerous Shorty Awards, such as: Honoree of Best Social Media in Video Games in 2016, Winner of Best Social Media in Video Games in 2016, Honorable Mention in Best Social Media in Video Games in 2015, and Winner of Best Social Media in Video Games in 2014. He is also featured in notable outlets such as Nylon Manila, Authority Magazine, and Rappler  for his personal and Tremendous' impact in the AAPI community.

References 

Year of birth missing (living people)
Living people
American people of Filipino descent
American film producers
American marketing people